The Chief of Air Staff (reporting name: CAS) is a military appointment and a statutory office held by an Air Chief Marshal in the Pakistan Air Force, who is appointed by the Prime Minister of Pakistan and final confirmation by the President of Pakistan. The CAS is the highest-ranking officer of the Pakistan Air Force and only pilots are appointed in this post.

The Chief of the Air Staff is a senior most military appointment in the Pakistani military who is a senior member of the Joint Chiefs of Staff Committee in a separate capacity, usually providing necessary consultation to the Chairman joint chiefs to act as a principal military adviser to the Prime Minister and its civilian government in the line of defending and guarding the nation's airspace and aerial borders.

The Chief of Air Staff exercise its responsibility of command and control of the operational, administration, combatant, logistics, and training commands within the Air Force. Due to its statute, the Chief of Air Staff maintain its importance of providing the strategic control and final decision-making issues relating the nation's national security.

The appointment, in principle, is constitutionally subjected for three years but extensions may be granted by the President upon recommendations and approvals from the Prime Minister. The Chief of Air Staff is based at the Air Headquarters, and the current Chief of Air Staff is Air Chief Marshal Zaheer Ahmad Baber.

History

The Pakistan Air Force was created from the partition of the Royal Indian Air Force after the partition of India in 1947, and were commanded by the appointments approved by the British Air Council. The position was then-known as the Commander in Chief who would directly report to the Governor-General who was also under British monarchs. At first, the office was held by the two-star rank air officer, an Air Vice Marshal, and later upgraded to a three-star rank, Air Marshal. The British Air Council continued making the appointment at the command level until 1957, when Pakistan had promoted a local air officer to the commanding position.

On 20 March 1972, the title of the office was changed from "Commander in Chief" to the "Chief of Air Staff" with Air Marshal Zafar Chaudhry being appointed as the first person to hold the latter title. The Air Force had its first four-star rank officer, an Air Chief Marshal, in 1974. The term of the superannuation was then constrained to three years in the office as opposed to four years and air chief was made a permanent member of Joint Chiefs of Staff Committee. Since 1974, there has been 14 four-star rank air force officers who have commanded the air force as its air chief.

The Chief of Air Staff is nominated and appointed by the Prime Minister whose appointment is then confirmed by the President. The air force leadership is based in the AHQ in Islamabad, at the vicinity of the Navy Headquarters.

The Chief of Air Staff leads the functions of the AHQ, assisted by the civilians from the Air Force Secretariat-II of the Ministry of Defence (MoD). The Chief of Air Staff exercise its responsibility of complete operational, training and logistics commands. In addition, the Air chief has several staff officers:-
 Vice Chief of Air Staff 
Deputy Chief of Air Staff Aerial Support (DCAS(S))
Deputy Chief of Air Staff Training and Evaluation (DCAS (T&E))
Deputy Chief of Air Staff Air Operations (DCAS AO)
Deputy Chief of Air Staff Personnel (DCAS P)
Deputy Chief of Air Staff Engineering (DCAS (E))
Director-General C4ISTAR (DG C4ISTAR)
Commander Air Force Strategic Command

Appointees 

The following tables chronicle the appointees to the office of the Chief of the Air Staff or its preceding positions since the independence of Pakistan.

(**Seconded from the Royal Air Force)

Commander-in-Chief of the Royal Pakistan Air Force (1947-55)
The Royal Indian Air Force was divided between India and Pakistan following the partition of India, hence the Royal Pakistan Air Force was formed in 1947. It was then headed by a Commander-in-Chief.

Commander-in-Chief of the Pakistan Air Force (1956-72)
Pakistan became an Islamic republic in 23 March 1956, hence royal was dropped from the name of the air force.

Chiefs of Air Staff of Pakistan Air Force (1972-present)

Rank insignia of the whole PAF was changed when ACM Tanvir Mahmood Ahmed was in the office.

See also
List of serving air marshals of the Pakistan Air Force
Pakistan Air Force ranks
Chairman Joint Chiefs of Staff Committee (Pakistan)
Chief of Army Staff (Pakistan)
Chief of Naval Staff (Pakistan)
Chief of General Staff (Pakistan)

References

External links
Official Website – Pakistan Air Force Chiefs of Air Staff Gallery
PAF s' Chief of the Air Staffs

Chiefs of Air Staff, Pakistan
Pakistan Air Force air marshals
Pakistan
Air force appointments
Pakistan Air Force appointments